Aurel Sîrbu (born 25 January 1971) is a Romanian weightlifter. He competed in the men's bantamweight event at the 1992 Summer Olympics.

References

1971 births
Living people
Romanian male weightlifters
Olympic weightlifters of Romania
Weightlifters at the 1992 Summer Olympics
Sportspeople from Cluj-Napoca
20th-century Romanian people